James Scott (born 18 June 1999) is an English rugby union player who plays for Jersey Reds in the RFU Championship. His main position is lock.

Club career
Having previously studied at Bishops Bluecoat in Hereford before moving to Malvern College, Scott joined the Worcester Warriors academy at Under 15 level and has represented Herefordshire County age-groups. He then joined the Warriors senior academy in 2017. 

He made his first-team debut from off the bench in a European Rugby Challenge Cup match against Stade Francais back in October 2018. It followed up with another match in the Challenge Cup against Pau in December 2018. 

As well playing regularly for Worcester Cavaliers in the Premiership Rugby Shield, Scott also furthered his development by playing for Hartpury University in the RFU Championship on a dual registration.

Scott made his first start against in the opening Premiership Rugby Cup match against Leicester Tigers in September 2019. He played in three European Challenge Cup matches during the season and made his Premiership debut when he started against Wasps in August 2020. 

On 18 June 2020, Scott signed his first professional contract to stay with Worcester at Sixways Stadium, thus promoted to the senior squad from the 2020-21 season.

He joined Glasgow Warriors on 18 February 2021 on a 6 week loan deal. He was named on the bench for Glasgow for their Pro14 match the following night against Ulster. He replaced Ryan Wilson for his Pro14 debut on 63 minutes, becoming Glasgow Warrior No. 322. The Warriors lost the match by 19 points to 13 points.

On 16 June 2022, Scott was released by Worcester as he signs for Jersey Reds in the RFU Championship in the 2022-23 season.

International career
Scott has represented England from U16s to 18 levels. Scott was a member of the England U20s side that was defeated by France U20s to win the 2018 Six Nations Under 20s Championship, and then beaten by France in the final of the 2018 World Rugby Under 20 Championship later that year. He was an ever-present for England in the 2019 Six Nations Under 20s Championship.

References

External links
Worcester Warriors Profile
ESPN Profile
Its Rugby Profile
Ultimate Rugby Profile

1999 births
Living people
English rugby union players
Worcester Warriors players
Rugby union locks
Glasgow Warriors players
Hartpury University R.F.C. players
Rugby union players from Solihull
Jersey Reds players